A plateau of a function is a part of its domain where the function has constant value.

More formally, let U, V be topological spaces. A plateau for a  function f: U → V is a path-connected set of points P of U such that for some y we have
f (p) = y
for all p in P.

Examples
Plateaus can be observed in mathematical models as well as natural systems. In nature, plateaus can be observed in physical, chemical and biological systems. An example of an observed plateau in the natural world is in the tabulation of biodiversity of life through time.

See also
Level set
Contour line
Minimal surface

References

Topology